Zimbabwe Sculpture: a Tradition in Stone is a permanent exhibit of sculpture at Hartsfield-Jackson Atlanta International Airport. It is sponsored by the city's Aviation Arts program. It features sculptures by some of Zimbabwe's best known sculptors such as Agnes Nyanhongo, Gedion Nyanhongo, Norbert Shamuyarira, Lameck Bonjisi, Edronce Rukodzi, Sylvester Mubayi, Joe Mutasa, Nicholas Mukomberanwa, Gladman Zinyeka, Tapfuma Gutsa, and Amos Supuni.

References

Zimbabwean sculpture
Sculpture exhibitions
Sculptures in Atlanta
Hartsfield–Jackson Atlanta International Airport